Asghar Ali Khan (born 26 February 1926) was a Pakistani field hockey player. He competed in the men's tournament at the 1952 Summer Olympics.

References

External links
 

1926 births
Possibly living people
Pakistani male field hockey players
Olympic field hockey players of Pakistan
Field hockey players at the 1952 Summer Olympics
Place of birth missing (living people)
20th-century Pakistani people